Rowland Day (March 6, 1779 Chester, Hampden County, Massachusetts – December 23, 1853 Moravia, Cayuga County, New York) was an American merchant and politician from New York. From 1823 to 1825, he served one term in the  U.S. House of Representatives.

Life
In 1805, Day removed to Skaneateles, and in 1810 to Sempronius. He engaged in mercantile pursuits, and was Supervisor of the Town of Sempronius for several years.

He was a member of the New York State Assembly in 1816-17, and a delegate to the New York State Constitutional Convention of 1821.

Congress 
Day was elected as a Crawford Democratic-Republican to the 18th, and as a Jacksonian to the 23rd United States Congress, holding office from March 4, 1823, to March 3, 1825, and from March 4, 1833, to March 3, 1835.

Later career and death 
He was Postmaster of Sempronius. In 1833, the Western part of Sempronius (where Day lived) was separated as the Town of Moravia.

He was buried at the Indian Mound Cemetery in Moravia

References

The New York Civil List compiled by Franklin Benjamin Hough (pages 57, 71f, 192 and 269; Weed, Parsons and Co., 1858)
Table of the Post Offices in the United States (1831; page 46)

1779 births
1853 deaths
People from Moravia, New York
People from Skaneateles, New York
People from Sempronius, New York
People from Hampden County, Massachusetts
Members of the New York State Assembly
New York (state) postmasters
Town supervisors in New York (state)
Democratic-Republican Party members of the United States House of Representatives from New York (state)
Jacksonian members of the United States House of Representatives from New York (state)
19th-century American politicians
Members of the United States House of Representatives from New York (state)